Voza Rivers is an American producer and co-producer of theater, film, music, and live events, born in Harlem, New York. Rivers’ work as a theater producer, music executive, event producer, and documentary filmmaker has been presented in the United States, Japan, South Africa, Togo, Nigeria, Cuba, Canada, and the United Kingdom.

Rivers is the chairman and co-founder of the Harlem Arts Alliance, an arts service membership organization founded in 2001. He is the executive producer and founding member of the New Heritage Theatre Group (NHTG), established in 1964, and executive producer and co-founder of IMPACT Repertory Theatre, the Oscar and GRAMMY-nominated youth and music division of New Heritage Theatre Group.  Rivers serves as the First Vice President of the Greater Harlem Chamber of Commerce and the co-founder, Vice Chairman, and Executive Producer of HARLEM WEEK, which began in 1974 as a one-day tribute to Harlem and has evolved over 46 years to become a month-long celebration of the community's economic, political and cultural history. Rivers is the former chairman of the Board of Directors of Community Works, a nonprofit arts and education organization.

Career history
Rivers was President of NY Entertainment and Sports Advisors (ESA) when ESA served as business manager to Count Basie and the Basie Orchestra; two-time Tony nominee South African Playwright Mbongeni Ngema; Tony-winning actor Ben Harney (Dreamgirls); GRAMMY award-winning rock band, Living Color; singer-songwriter Me’Shell NdegéOcello; and partner with Percy Sutton in Apollo Theater Artist Management.

The GRAMMY-nominated Rivers has served as Executive Vice President and Chief Operating Officer of Apollo Records, President of PRG Records, President and chief executive officer of Voz Entertainment Group, and President of Greenlight Films, a black-owned film company.

Rivers’ theatrical productions include a collaboration with Committed Artists South Africa, Duma Ndlovu and South African playwright Mbongeni Ngema to present the OBIE award-winning “Woza Albert!;” Tony-nominated South African play, “Asinamali,” which was executive produced on Broadway by Harry Belafonte, Miriam Makeba, Paul Simon, Hamilton Fish, and others; the Tony and GRAMMY-nominated hit Broadway musical “Sarafina;” and in partnership with Lincoln Center and The Brooklyn Academy of Music, “Township Fever.”  These plays brought to light the political, social, and economic impact of apartheid in South Africa.

Discography
Voza Rivers has multiple discography credits including a writing arrangement credit for Tupac Shakur's "The Rose That Grew From Concrete Volume 1", released by Amaru Entertainment and Interscope Records in 2000. Rivers has production credits for the following: Mbongeni Ngema's  "Sarafina! The Music Of Liberation" (1988); American R&B and soul artist Milira's self-titled album "Milira" (1990) and "Back Again!!!" (1992); and American singer-songwriter Paulette McWilliam's 2007 album "Flow". Rivers has also managed several artists including American singer-songwriter Joyce Sims and Milira.

Awards and recognition
1984: Black Personality of the Month Voza Rivers, Anheuser-Busch/ Black American
1988: United Nations Medal for Peace for "Sarafina!"
1988: FEDAPT Award for GRAMMY and TONY nominated SARAFINA!, League of American Theatres and Producers
1988: St. George Associations Art and Culture Award for SARAFINA!, St. George Association
1989: 1989 Grammy Nomination for the "Sarafina!" Cast Album
1991: N Y 1 Television "New Yorker of the Week", NY 1 Television
1996: Ruth Whitehead Whaley Award, Association of Black Women Attorneys for Community Service
1998: Harlem Jazz & Music Festival Tiffany Award, Harlem Jazz and Music Festival
1999: WHO'S WHO of Professionals Honoree
2000: AUDELCO Outstanding Pioneer Award in Theater, Audience Development Committee, Inc
2000: New York Foundation for the Arts Union Square Award, New York Foundation of the Arts
2001: Culture Fest Theatre Award, Your Culture Counts: Voza Rivers, Culture Fest
2001: William Jefferson Clinton Salute to IMPACT Repertory Theatre
2001: Forces of Nature NIA Award
2001: John Hunter Memorial Humanitarian Award
2002: Harlem Health Community Service Award, Harlem Hospital Center
2002: Omega Psi Phi, Xi Phi chapter "Citizen of the Year" Award
2002: Kwanzaa Foundation Nguzo Saba Award for Creativity''
2002: National Conference of Artists  NCA NY Chapter Leadership Award
2003: Outstanding Achievement and Stalwart Commitment to the Arts, Delta Sigma Theta sorority
2003: Distinguished Humanitarian Award from the Samaritan Foundation
2003: HARLEM WEEK Kick Off Special Award, presented by Mayor Mike Bloomberg
2005: Arts Organizing Award, National Conference of Artists
2005: I AM Award, Oliver Black Production in Association with IAM and the Harlem Arts Alliance
2005: Black History Makers Arts Organizing Award, The National Conference of Artists New York 
2006: Ellie Charles Award, African Voices Magazine
2006: Community Service Award, Harlem Business Alliance
2006: Vanguard Award, Black To Broadway
2006: Star Achiever Award, United Negro College Fund
2006: “The VIV” to IMPACT Repertory Theatre at the 35th Annual Vivian Robinson/AUDELCO Recognition Awards
2007: Peace Award, Kobe International Harmony Eyes Festival
2007: Larry Leopn Hamlin Producers Award, National Black Theatre Festival
2008: Distinguished Community Service Award, E.Louise Richardson
2008: Mind Builders Creative Arts Center Cultural Legacy Award, Mind Builders Creative Arts Center
2009: One of the Most Influential New Yorkers in Arts and Culture, New York Daily News
2009: Cover Story, Black Masks Magazin'
2009: 45th Anniversary of NHTG Salute: Voza Rivers, Community Works and the DWYER Cultural Center
2012: The New York Coalition of Black Women Honor the Life and Accomplishments of Voza Rivers, The New York Coalition of Black Women
2012: Talladega College Alumni Association of Greater New York Honors Voza Rivers, College Alumni Association of Greater New York
2012: Leadership Award, The Children's Storefront Independent School in Harlem
2012: Mother Dovetta Wilson Leadership Award, The City of New York Office of the President Borough of Manhattan Scott M. Springer
2013: Roy Wilkins Lifetime Achievement Award,  NAACP Mid-Manhattan Branch 
2013: Certificate of Special Congressional Recognition presented by Honorable Charles B. Rangel,  Member of Congress
2014: Greater Harlem Chamber of Commerce on 40th Anniversary of HARLEM WEEK Award, Jazzmobile
2014: Winona Lee Fletcher Award, Black Theatre Network
2014: Honorable Charles B. Rangel of New York Congress Recognizes New Federal Theatre's 44th Anniversary Gala, Honoring Legendary Producer Voza Rivers and New Heritage Theatre Group, Honorable Charles B. Rangel
2014: Shakespeare's Birthplace Trust Award, Honoring the Harlem Shakespeare Festival
2015: Trailblazer Award Presented to New Heritage Theatre Group, Harlem Congregations for Community Improvement
2015: Oliver Black Productions 1st Annual NEO Awards
2016: Tunde Samuel Award for Outstanding Community Excellence
2017: Catholic Charities Hall of Fame Honoree Lt. Joseph P Kennedy Memorial Center
2017: Salvation Army Harlem Temple Corps Honoree Awards
2018: National Jazz Museum in Harlem Outstanding Service and Achievement in the Arts
2019: Otto Rene Castillo Award for Political Theater
2020: Harlem Fine Arts Show Life Achievement Award
2020: Lifetime Achievement Award, AUDELCO, Audience Development Committee, Inc
2020: Ossie Davis Award in Recognition of Your Work as a Theater Producer and Documentary Filmmaker
2021: Uptown Night Market - Celebrating 20th Anniversary of Harlem Arts Alliance

References

Living people
1942 births
American theatre managers and producers
Film producers from New York (state)
American documentary filmmakers
People from Harlem